The white-eared bulbul (Pycnonotus leucotis) is a member of the bulbul family. It is found in south-western Asia from India to the Arabian peninsula.

Taxonomy and systematics
The white-eared bulbul was originally described in the genus Ixos. The white-eared bulbul is considered to belong to a superspecies along with the Himalayan bulbul, white-spectacled bulbul, African red-eyed bulbul, Cape bulbul, and the common bulbul. Formerly, some authorities considered the white-eared bulbul to be a subspecies of the Himalayan Bulbul.

Subspecies
Two subspecies are recognized:
 Arabian white-cheeked bulbul (P. l. mesopotamia) - Ticehurst, 1918: Found in north-eastern Arabia, southern Iraq and south-western Iran
 P. l. leucotis - (Gould, 1836): Found in southern Iran, southern Afghanistan, Pakistan and north-western India

Description and vocalisations

The white-eared bulbul is rotund in appearance, and has a brownish-grey body. The tail of this bird is relatively long, tapering outwards. Starting off black, the tail feathers end in white tips. The head of the white-eared bulbul is black, with the area around its cheeks bearing a large white spot. The eye rings of the bulbul are bare, and the beak short. The vent of the bird is bright yellow.

The white-eared bulbul does not have a uniform song but rather a set of notes, which can be used to chirp different melodies. The song is brief, but is described as being "pleasant and fluid."

Distribution
It is native to the western reaches of India, much of Pakistan, southern Afghanistan, coastal Iran, as well as much of the two-river basin in Iraq, Kuwait, and the island of Bahrain.

It has been introduced to the remaining Persian Gulf countries including Oman, the UAE, and Qatar.

Conservation
The species is listed by the IUCN as "Least Concern" as of 2018 but population sizes are declining.

Gallery

References

 Pocket Guide to the Birds of the Indian Subcontinent (1999) and multiple reprints. Richard Grimmett, Carol Inskipp and Tim Inskipp, Oxford University Press, New Delhi

External links

 BirdLife Species Factsheet

white-eared bulbul
Birds of Afghanistan
Birds of Pakistan
Birds of India
Birds of the Middle East
white-eared bulbul